Cameroon participated at the 2018 Summer Youth Olympics in Buenos Aires, Argentina from 6 October to 18 October 2018.

Competitors

Athletics

Badminton

Cameroon was given a quota to compete by the tripartite committee. 

 Girls' singles – 1 quota
Singles

Team

Futsal

Girls
Summary

Group D

Judo

Boys

Mixed team

Weightlifting

Cameroon was given a quota by the tripartite committee to compete in weightlifting.

Wrestling

Key:
  – Victory by Fall
  – Without any points scored by the opponent
  – With point(s) scored by the opponent
  – Without any points scored by the opponent
  – With point(s) scored by the opponent

References

2018 in Cameroonian sport
Nations at the 2018 Summer Youth Olympics
Cameroon at the Youth Olympics